Julie Lengweiler (born 6 November 1998) is a Swiss volleyball player. She is a member of the Women's National Team.
She participated at the 2016 FIVB Volleyball Women's Club World Championship, and 2017 Montreux Volley Masters.

Clubs 
  Volero Zürich (2017–)

 Club actual: CV Haris La Laguna (canarias-España) número 14 (2022-

References

External links 
 FIVB Profile
 CEV profile

1998 births
Living people
Swiss women's volleyball players
Place of birth missing (living people)